Federal Rest House or Rumah Peranginan Persekutuan are the rest houses owned by the Federal Government of Malaysia under Property and Land Management Division of the Prime Minister's Department (Bahagian Pengurusan Hartanah, Jabatan Perdana Menteri). It is served as a government vacation retreat for government sectors.

Overview
There are three types of Federal Rest House:-
Federal Rest House (Rumah Peranginan Persekutuan)
Federal Accommodation House (Rumah Penginapan Persekutuan)
Federal Transit House (Rumah Transit Persekutuan)

List of Federal Rest House (Rumah Peranginan Persekutuan)

List of Federal Accommodation Houses (Rumah Penginapan Persekutuan)

Malaysia

Overseas

List of Federal Transit House (Rumah Transit Persekutuan)

References
Bahagian Pengurusan Hartanah, Jabatan Perdana Menteri (Property and Land Management Division of the Prime Minister's Department)

Prime Minister's Department (Malaysia)
Tourism in Malaysia
Government buildings in Malaysia